Matthias Triantafyllidis was a Greek sports shooter. He competed at the 1906 Intercalated Games and the 1908 Summer Olympics.

References

Year of birth missing
Year of death missing
Greek male sport shooters
Olympic shooters of Greece
Shooters at the 1906 Intercalated Games
Shooters at the 1908 Summer Olympics
Sportspeople from Athens